Barbara Dutrow (born 1956) is an American geologist who is the Adolphe G. Gueymard Professor of Geology at Louisiana State University. Dutrow wrote the textbook Manual of Mineral Science. She was elected President of the Geological Society of America in 2021.

Early life and education 
Dutrow is from Chadron, Nebraska. Her father was a General Motors dealer. She has said that she became interested in geology at a young age, and collected purple quartz from Lake McConaughy. She was an undergraduate student at Chadron State College. She moved to Texas for graduate studies, joining the Southern Methodist University and working on vertebrate palaeontology. Dutrow remained at the Southern Methodist University for her doctoral studies, switching her focus to vertebrate paleontology and pleistocene mammoth assemblage. She was appointed an Alexander von Humboldt Foundation Fellow at the University of Münster Institut für Mineralogie. In 1989 Dutrow returned to the United States, where she was appointed research associate at the University of Arizona.

Research and career 
Dutrow joined Louisiana State University as an Assistant Professor, and was promoted to the Adolphe G. Gueymard Professor in 2002. In 2009 she was elected President of the Mineralogical Society of America, and has remained on the Executive Committee since.

In 2020, the International Mineralogical Association named a newly discovered mineral in her honour, Dutrowite. The mineral, Na(Fe2+2.5Ti0.5)Al6(Si6O18)(BO3)3(OH)3O, was discovered in the Apuan Alps and formed from the metamorphism of Rhyolite. Of the many tourmaline species, Dutrowite is the only one to be named after a woman. She was elected President of the Geological Society of America in 2021.

Awards and honors 
 2002 Elected Fellow of the Geological Society of America
 2007 Elected Fellow of the Mineralogical Society of America
 2009 Chadron State College Distinguished Alumni Award
 2021 Elected President of the Geological Society of America

Selected publications

Books

Personal life 
Dutrow is a long distance runner. She is married to Darrell Henry, a geology professor at Louisiana State University.

References 

American geologists
21st-century American geologists
1956 births
Louisiana State University faculty
People from Chadron, Nebraska
Chadron State College alumni
American female long-distance runners
Living people
Presidents of the Geological Society of America
21st-century American women